The Battle of Blountville, sometimes called Battle of Blountsville, was a battle of the American Civil War, occurring on September 22, 1863, in Sullivan County, Tennessee.

Battle
The battle occurred during a Union expedition into East Tennessee led by Major General Ambrose Burnside, commander of the Department of the Ohio, with the objective of clearing the roads and gaps to Virginia and securing the saltworks in southwestern Virginia. On September 22, Union Col. John W. Foster, with his cavalry and artillery, engaged Col. James E. Carter and his troops at Blountville. Foster attacked at noon and in the four-hour battle shelled the town and initiated a flanking movement, compelling the  Confederates to withdraw. Blountsville was the initial step in the Union’s attempt to force Confederate Maj. Gen. Sam Jones and his command to retire from East Tennessee.

The Sullivan County courthouse in Blountville was gutted by a fire that broke out during the shelling. It was rebuilt in 1866.

External links 
 Battle of Blountville Reenactment and Military Park

References 

 
 CWSAC Report Update

Blountville
Blountville
Blountville
Blountville
Blountville
Sullivan County, Tennessee
Blountville
1863 in Tennessee
Blountville, Tennessee
September 1863 events